This is a list of notable people who are associated with the town of Woodstock, New York, United States. They may not have been born there or live there presently, or may be deceased.

Musicians
Daevid Allen – Australian singer and guitarist of Soft Machine and Gong
John Ashton – English-born producer and guitarist for The Psychedelic Furs
The Band members: Rick Danko, Levon Helm, Garth Hudson, Richard Manuel, and Robbie Robertson – the five shared a house together, where they recorded The Basement Tapes (with Bob Dylan) and wrote several songs for Music from Big Pink. The house, dubbed "Big Pink" is in neighboring Saugerties, though Danko, Manuel, Hudson and Helm all eventually moved to Woodstock. Danko and Helm are both buried in the Woodstock Cemetery on Rock City Road.
Cyro Baptista – Brazilian-born percussionist
Richard Bell – keyboardist
Karl Berger – jazz educator, vibraphonist, founder Creative Music Studio
Carla Bley – jazz composer, pianist, organist and bandleader
David Bowie – songwriter, musician, actor, fashion icon
Harvey Brooks – bassist, producer, songwriter, composer
Paul Butterfield – blues musician
Cindy Cashdollar – dobro, five-time Grammy Award winner
Jimmy Cobb – jazz drummer
Imani Coppola – singer, songwriter, musician (early 2000s)
Henry Cowell – composer 
Marshall Crenshaw – musician, songwriter, resident from 1987–2004 
Marilyn Crispell – pianist 
Karen Dalton – singer
Kal David – blues musician
Jack DeJohnette – jazz drummer 
Alix Dobkin – singer-songwriter
Robbie Dupree – singer-songwriter 
Bob Dylan – singer-songwriter, lived in Woodstock 1965–1972; had his infamous motorcycle accident in Bearsville in 1966
Joey Eppard – Kingston, New York-born singer, songwriter, guitarist, bassist; best known for his Kingston Rock band, 3
Donald Fagen – co-founder Steely Dan
Jackson C. Frank – folk singer
Matt Flynn – drummer for band Maroon 5
Jackson C. Frank – singer-songwriter
Paul Green – founder of Paul Green School of Rock Music (now School of Rock)
John Hall – musician, co-founder of Orleans
Amy Helm – daughter of Levon Helm
Jimi Hendrix – guitarist, singer, songwriter 
John Herald – bluegrass singer, songwriter Greenbriar Boys
Darryl Jenifer – bassist for Bad Brains
Bill Keith – banjo player, composer; developed melodic or Keith style banjo picking
Dr. Know (guitarist) – punk rock guitarist, notably for Bad Brains.
Steve Knight – keyboardist for Mountain
Tony Levin – bassist
Donna Lewis - I love you always forever
Frank Luther – bassist
Jennifer Maidman – musician and producer
John Martyn – singer-songwriter
John Medeski – keyboardist and composer for Medeski, Martin & Wood 
Pat Metheny – Grammy Award-winning guitarist 
Charles Mingus – bassist, bandleader 
Elizabeth Mitchell – singer, composer, guitarist for indie band Ida

Thelonious Monk – jazz musician
Tim Moore – singer-songwriter
Van Morrison – singer-songwriter
Fred Neil – singer-songwriter
Carl Newman aka A.C. Newman – lead singer, guitarist, songwriter of The New Pornographers
David "Fathead" Newman – jazz musician
Pauline Oliveros – pioneering accordionist and composer

Graham Parker – singer-songwriter
David Peel – member of The Lower East Side Band
Kate Pierson – singer, songwriter, The B-52's
John Platania – guitarist Van Morrison
Vasant Rai – sarod player, composer
Bonnie Raitt – singer-songwriter
Tom Rapp – singer-songwriter, leader of band Pearls Before Swine
Billy Riker – guitarist, bassist and keyboard player, Kingston Rock band 3
Sonny Rollins – saxophonist
Mick Ronson – guitarist, producer arranger with David Bowie
Todd Rundgren – singer-songwriter
David Sanborn – saxophonist
Ed Sanders – poet, founder of Fugs band
Carlos Santana – guitarist
Peter Schickele – composer, best known for music he wrote as P.D.Q. Bach
Max Schneider – Rags, Nickelodeon's How To Rock; singer and songwriter
John Sebastian – singer, a founder of The Lovin' Spoonful
Ravi Shankar – sitar player, composer
Andy Shernoff – musician, songwriter, producer, founding member of The Dictators
John Simon – musician, producer
Robert Starer – pianist and composer
Keith Strickland – composer, guitarist and founding member of The B-52s
Libby Titus – singer, songwriter
Michael Todd – bassist for Coheed and Cambria
Artie Traum – award-winning guitarist, producer and songwriter
Happy Traum – folk musician
David Van Tieghem – composer, percussionist, sound designer
Gene Ween – a founding member of band Ween
Jim Weider – telecaster guitarist, member of The Band
Eric Weissberg – banjo player, best known for theme from movie Deliverance
Gary Windo – saxophonist
Yehudi Wyner – composer, musical director of The Turnau Opera
Rachael Yamagata – singer-songwriter; wrote album Elephants...Teeth Sinking Into Heart during nine-month period in Woodstock

Artists
Marianne Appel - painter, puppet designer, and illustrator 
Alexander Archipenko – sculptor
George Ault – painter
Milton Avery – painter
George Bellows – painter
Arnold Blanch – painter 
Lucile Blanch – painter
James Brooks – painter
Edward Leigh Chase – painter
Frank Swift Chase – painter
Andrew Michael Dasburg – painter
Julio de Diego – painter, jeweler
Richard Diebenkorn – painter
Anton Otto Fischer - painter
Harvey Fite – sculptor
Mary Frank – painter
Milton Glaser – graphic designer (creator of the ‘I Love New York’ logo)
Marion Greenwood – painter, muralist
Philip Guston – painter
Rosella Hartman – painter, etcher and lithographer
Sam Henderson – cartoonist
Robert Henri – painter
Eva Hesse – sculptor
Richard Humann – conceptual artist
Joel Iskowitz – Master Designer, United States Mint
Sy Kattelson – photographer
Yasuo Kuniyoshi – painter, sculptor
Jacques Kupfermann – painter 
Ronnie Landfield – painter
Elliot Landy – photographer
Doris Lee – painter
Laura Levine – photographer, painter, illustrator, filmmaker 
Eugene Ludins – painter and art teacher
Ethel Magafan – painter
Norm Magnusson – painter, sculptor, photographer, political artist
Georges Malkine – painter
Fletcher Martin – painter
Paul Meltsner – painter

Anton Refregier – painter
Randall Schmit – painter
Eugene Speicher – painter
Bradley Walker Tomlin – painter

Writers

Shalom Auslander – author
Larry Beinhart – author of American Hero, which was adapted for the political-parody film Wag the Dog
Heywood Hale Broun – author and TV commentator
Hob Broun – author
Joseph Campbell – author, mythologist
Jeff Cohen – media critic
Hart Crane – poet
Robert Duncan – poet
Alf Evers – historian and author
Neil Gaiman – author
Gail Godwin – author
Carey Harrison – novelist, dramatist
Paul Hoffman – science author and TV host
Barney Hoskyns – author and music journalist
Howard Koch – screenwriter who wrote 1938 radio drama  The War of the Worlds and won Academy Award for Casablanca
Sean Lahman – historian and sportswriter
Dakota Lane – author and photographer
Henry Morton Robinson – novelist
Ed Sanders – author and publisher
Ruth Simpson – author and lesbian/feminist activist
Amy Tan – author
Anita Miller Smith – historian, painter and herbalist
Clark Strand – non-fiction spiritual writer
Theodore Sturgeon – science-fiction author
Robert Thurman – Buddhist scholar, author; father of actress Uma Thurman
Eli Waldron – short story writer, novelist, poet, journalist, artist
Walter Weyl – leader of the Progressive movement

Film directors
Leon Gast – director of When We Were Kings
Lacey Schwartz Delgado – filmmaker and second lady of New York
Sarah Pirozek – director of Free Tibet

Actors and theater people
Gaston Bell (1877-1963) – stage and silent screen actor; retired to Woodstock; first director the Woodstock Community Players 
Chevy Chase (1943- ) - actor and comedian, grew up summering and weekending in Woodstock, where his father was born and raised 
Jennifer Connelly (1970- ) – Oscar-winning actress, lived in Woodstock for several years during her childhood
Brad Dourif (1950- ) – Oscar-nominated actor, lived in Woodstock in the 1970s and 80s
Ethan Hawke (1970- ) – Oscar-nominated actor, lived just outside Woodstock with then-wife Uma Thurman
Jan Hooks (1957–2014) - actress and comedienne, lived in Woodstock at the time of her death
Piper Laurie (1932- ) – Oscar-nominated actress, lived in Woodstock in the 1970s
Lee Marvin (1924-1987) – Oscar-winning actor, lived in Woodstock periodically throughout his life
Sylvia Miles (1932-2019) – Oscar-nominated actress
Estelle Parsons (1927- ) – Oscar-winning actress, appeared in summer stock productions in Woodstock during the 1960s
Max Schneider (1992- ) – actor, singer, songwriter
Max Martini (1969- ) – actor, born in Woodstock
Uma Thurman (1970- ) – Oscar-nominated actress, lived in Woodstock during her childhood; daughter of resident Robert Thurman; returned with former husband Ethan Hawke

Others
Betty Ballantine and Ian Ballantine - founders of Bantam Books and Ballantine Books; after the 1970s, were independent publishers; said to have started the paperback book industry in America.
George Bonanno - psychologist renowned for his work on grief and trauma. 
John Burroughs - naturalist
Josephine McKim Chalmers - swimmer, medalist in 1928 and 1932 Summer Olympics; actress; sister-in law of artist Philip Guston
John Dewey - educator, a founder of the philosophical school of Pragmatism
William King Gregory, zoologist
Albert Grossman - manager, producer and founder of Bearsville Records; his studio has attracted hundreds of musicians to record in Woodstock
Steven Hager - chief editor, High Times magazine
Phil Jackson - NBA basketball coach and player, general manager of New York Knicks
Walter McCaw - U.S. Army surgeon who attained the rank of brigadier general in World War I
Philippe Petit - funambulist, known for walking a tightrope between the World Trade Center twin towers
Kathleen de Vere Taylor - suffragist and stockbroker
Werner Vordtriede - professor of German and author

References
References for notability

References establishing association with Woodstock

Woodstock, New York
 
Woodstock
Woodstock, New York